Sir Fielding Clarke (23 February 1851 – 30 July 1928) was a British colonial barrister, civil servant and jurist. He served as Chief Justice of Fiji, Hong Kong and Jamaica.

Early life
Clarke was the fourth son of Henry Booth Clarke and his wife Isabella. He married in 1888 Mary (May) Milward Pierce, the daughter of Mr Justice Timbrell Pierce D.L.

Education
Clarke was educated in Switzerland and then returned to England to attend King's College London and London University (LLB). On 12 November 1872 he was admitted to Middle Temple and in 1876 was called to the bar of the Middle Temple.

Career
After being called to the Bar, Clarke practised on the North Eastern Circuit.

In 1881, he embarked on career as a civil servant and jurist in various British colonies. In that year, he was appointed Attorney General of Fiji in 1881 and served in that position until 1885.  He acted as Chief Justice of Fiji and Chief Judicial Commissioner, Western Pacific from 1882 to 1883 and in 1884.  In 1885 he was appointed Chief Justice of Fiji & Chief Judicial Commissioner, Western Pacific.  He served in that position until 1889.

In 1889, he was appointed Puisne Judge, of the Supreme Court of Hong Kong.

In 1892 he was appointed Chief Justice of Hong Kong succeeding Sir James Russell.

Clarke was knighted in 1894 while Chief Justice of Hong Kong.

In 1896 he was appointed as Chief Justice of Jamaica and served in that position until 1911 when he retired.  He moved to Southchurch, Essex and later lived in Stifford, Essex.

In retirement, he was appointed, in 1916, to the Appeal Tribunal for the County of Essex created under the Military Service Act 1916 which introduced conscription.

Death

Clarke died on 30 July 1928 in Essex, England.

|-

|-

|-

|-

|-

|-

|-

|-

References

1851 births
1928 deaths
Alumni of King's College London
Attorneys General of the Colony of Fiji
Attorneys-general of Fiji
British expatriates in Fiji
British expatriates in Hong Kong
British expatriates in Jamaica
British expatriates in Switzerland
British Hong Kong judges
Chief judicial commissioners for the Western Pacific
Chief justices of Fiji
Chief justices of Jamaica
Chief Justices of the Supreme Court of Hong Kong
Colony of Fiji judges
Colony of Jamaica judges
Knights Bachelor
Lawyers awarded knighthoods
Members of the Middle Temple
19th-century Jamaican judges